This is a list of the bird species recorded in Mauritius. The avifauna of Mauritius include a total of 155 species, of which 28 are endemic, and 22 have been introduced by humans.  

This list's taxonomic treatment (designation and sequence of orders, families and species) and nomenclature (common and scientific names) follow the conventions of The Clements Checklist of Birds of the World, 2022 edition. The family accounts at the beginning of each heading reflect this taxonomy, as do the species counts found in each family account. Introduced and accidental species are included in the total counts for Mauritius.

The following tags have been used to highlight several categories.

(A) Accidental - a species that rarely or accidentally occurs in Mauritius
(E) Endemic - a species endemic to Mauritius
(I) Introduced - a species introduced to Mauritius as a consequence, direct or indirect, of human actions
(Ex) Extirpated - a species that no longer occurs in Mauritius although populations exist elsewhere
(X) Extinct - a species that was found on Mauritius but is no longer found alive globally

Ducks, geese, and waterfowl

Order: AnseriformesFamily: Anatidae

Anatidae includes the ducks and most duck-like waterfowl, such as geese and swans. These birds are adapted to an aquatic existence with webbed feet, flattened bills, and feathers that are excellent at shedding water due to an oily coating. 

Mauritius shelduck, Alopochen mauritiana (X)
Garganey, Spatula querquedula
Meller's duck, Anas melleri (I)
Mallard, Anas platyrhynchos (A)
Mauritius duck, Anas theodori (X)

Guineafowl

Order: GalliformesFamily: Numididae

Guineafowl are a group of African, seed-eating, ground-nesting birds that resemble partridges, but with featherless heads and spangled grey plumage.

Helmeted guineafowl, Numida meleagris (I)

Pheasants, grouse, and allies

Order: GalliformesFamily: Phasianidae

The Phasianidae are a family of terrestrial birds. In general, they are plump (although they vary in size) and have broad, relatively short wings. 

Ring-necked pheasant, Phasianus colchicus (I)
Gray francolin, Ortygornis pondicerianus (I)
Chinese francolin, Francolinus pintadeanus (I)
Blue-breasted quail, Synoicus chinensis (Ex)
Common quail, Coturnix coturnix (I)
Jungle bush-quail, Perdicula asiatica (Ex)

Flamingos
Order: PhoenicopteriformesFamily: Phoenicopteridae

Flamingos are gregarious wading birds, usually , found in both the Western and Eastern Hemispheres. Flamingos filter-feed on shellfish and algae. Their oddly shaped beaks are specially adapted to separate mud and silt from the food they consume and, uniquely, are used upside-down. 

Greater flamingo, Phoenicopterus roseus (A)
Lesser flamingo, Phoenicopterus minor (A)

Pigeons and doves

Order: ColumbiformesFamily: Columbidae

Pigeons and doves are stout-bodied birds with short necks and short slender bills with a fleshy cere.

Rock pigeon, Columba livia (I)
Mauritius wood-pigeon, Columba thiriouxi (X)
Pink pigeon, Nesoenas mayeri (E)
Mauritius turtle-dove, Nesoenas cicur (X)
Rodrigues turtle-dove, Nesoenas rodericanus (X)
Malagasy turtle-dove, Nesoenas picturatus (I)
Spotted dove, Streptopelia chinensis (I)
Laughing dove, Streptopelia senegalensis (A)
Zebra dove, Geopelia striata (I)
Dodo, Raphus cucullatus (X)
Rodrigues solitaire, Pezophaps solitaria (X)
Mauritius blue-pigeon, Alectroenas nitidissimus (X)
Rodrigues blue-pigeon, Alectroenas payandeei (X)

Swifts

Order: CaprimulgiformesFamily: Apodidae

Swifts are small birds which spend the majority of their lives flying. These birds have very short legs and never settle voluntarily on the ground, perching instead only on vertical surfaces. Many swifts have long swept-back wings which resemble a crescent or boomerang. 

White-throated needletail, Hirundapus caudacutus (A)
Mascarene swiftlet, Aerodramus francicus

Rails, gallinules and coots
Order: GruiformesFamily: Rallidae

Rallidae is a large family of small to medium-sized birds which includes the rails, crakes, coots and gallinules. Typically they inhabit dense vegetation in damp environments near lakes, swamps or rivers. In general they are shy and secretive birds, making them difficult to observe. Most species have strong legs and long toes which are well adapted to soft uneven surfaces. They tend to have short, rounded wings and to be weak fliers.

White-throated rail, Dryolimnas cuvieri
Red rail, Aphanapteryx bonasia (X)
Rodrigues rail, Erythromachus leguati (X)
Buff-banded rail, Gallirallus philippensis (A)
Eurasian moorhen, Gallinula chloropus
Mascarene coot, Fulica newtonii (X)
Allen's gallinule, Porphyrio alleni (A)
African swamphen, Porphyrio madagascariensis (A)

Plovers and lapwings
Order: CharadriiformesFamily: Charadriidae

The family Charadriidae includes the plovers, dotterels and lapwings. They are small to medium-sized birds with compact bodies, short, thick necks and long, usually pointed, wings. They are found in open country worldwide, mostly in habitats near water. 

Black-bellied plover, Pluvialis squatarola
Lesser sand-plover, Charadrius mongolus (A)
Greater sand-plover, Charadrius leschenaultii
Common ringed plover, Charadrius hiaticula
Little ringed plover, Charadrius dubius (A)

Sandpipers and allies
Order: CharadriiformesFamily: Scolopacidae

Scolopacidae is a large diverse family of small to medium-sized shorebirds including the sandpipers, curlews, godwits, shanks, tattlers, woodcocks, snipes, dowitchers and phalaropes. The majority of these species eat small invertebrates picked out of the mud or soil. Variation in length of legs and bills enables multiple species to feed in the same habitat, particularly on the coast, without direct competition for food.

Whimbrel, Numenius phaeopus
Eurasian curlew, Numenius arquata
Bar-tailed godwit, Limosa lapponica
Ruddy turnstone, Arenaria interpres
Great knot, Calidris tenuirostris (A)
Ruff, Calidris pugnax (A)
Broad-billed sandpiper, Calidris falcinellus (A)
Curlew sandpiper, Calidris ferruginea
Sanderling, Calidris alba
Little stint, Calidris minuta 
Terek sandpiper, Xenus cinereus
Common sandpiper, Actitis hypoleucos (A)
Green sandpiper, Tringa ochropus (A)
Gray-tailed tattler, Tringa brevipes (A)
Common greenshank, Tringa nebularia
Marsh sandpiper, Tringa stagnatilis (A)
Wood sandpiper, Tringa glareola (A)

Buttonquail
Order: GruiformesFamily: Turnicidae

The buttonquail are small, drab, running birds which resemble the true quails. The female is the brighter of the sexes and initiates courtship. The male incubates the eggs and tends the young. 

Madagascar buttonquail, Turnix nigricollis (I)

Crab-plover
Order: GruiformesFamily: Dromadidae

The crab-plover is related to the waders. It resembles a plover but with very long grey legs and a strong heavy black bill similar to a tern's. It has black-and-white plumage, a long neck, partially webbed feet, and a bill designed for eating crabs.

Crab-plover, Dromas ardeola

Pratincoles and coursers
Order: CharadriiformesFamily: Glareolidae

Glareolidae is a family of wading birds comprising the pratincoles, which have short legs, long pointed wings and long forked tails, and the coursers, which have long legs, short wings and long, pointed bills which curve downwards. There are 17 species worldwide and 3 species which occur in Mauritius.

Collared pratincole, Glareola pratincola (A)
Oriental pratincole, Glareola maldivarum (A)
Madagascar pratincole, Glareola ocularis

Skuas and jaegers
Order: CharadriiformesFamily: Stercorariidae

The family Stercorariidae are, in general, medium to large birds, typically with grey or brown plumage, often with white markings on the wings. They nest on the ground in temperate and arctic regions and are long-distance migrants. 

South polar skua, Stercorarius maccormicki (A)
Pomarine jaeger, Stercorarius pomarinus

Gulls, terns, and skimmers
Order: CharadriiformesFamily: Laridae

Laridae is a family of medium to large seabirds, the gulls, terns, and skimmers. Gulls are typically grey or white, often with black markings on the head or wings. They have stout, longish bills and webbed feet. Terns are a group of generally medium to large seabirds typically with grey or white plumage, often with black markings on the head. Most terns hunt fish by diving but some pick insects off the surface of fresh water. Terns are generally long-lived birds, with several species known to live in excess of 30 years.

Brown noddy, Anous stolidus
Lesser noddy, Anous tenuirostris
White tern, Gygis alba
Sooty tern, Onychoprion fuscatus
Bridled tern, Onychoprion anaethetus
White-winged tern, Chlidonias leucopterus (A)
Roseate tern, Sterna dougallii 
Common tern, Sterna hirundo 
Great crested tern, Thalasseus bergii (A)
Lesser crested tern, Thalasseus bengalensis (A)

Tropicbirds

Order: PelecaniformesFamily: Phaethontidae

Tropicbirds are slender white birds of tropical oceans, with exceptionally long central tail feathers. Their heads and long wings have black markings. 

White-tailed tropicbird, Phaethon lepturus
Red-tailed tropicbird, Phaethon rubricauda

Albatrosses
Order: ProcellariiformesFamily: Diomedeidae

The albatrosses are among the largest of flying birds, and the great albatrosses from the genus Diomedea have the largest wingspans of any extant birds. There are 21 species worldwide and 5 species which occur in Mauritius.

Yellow-nosed albatross, Thalassarche chlororhynchos
White-capped albatross, Thalassarche cauta (A)
Sooty albatross, Phoebetria fusca (A)
Light-mantled albatross, Phoebetria palpebrata (A)
Wandering albatross, Diomedea exulans

Southern storm-petrels
Order: ProcellariiformesFamily: Oceanitidae

The southern storm-petrels are relatives of the petrels and are the smallest seabirds. They feed on planktonic crustaceans and small fish picked from the surface, typically while hovering. The flight is fluttering and sometimes bat-like.

Wilson's storm-petrel, Oceanites oceanicus
White-faced storm-petrel, Pelagodroma marina (A)
White-bellied storm-petrel, Fregetta grallaria
Black-bellied storm-petrel, Fregetta tropica

Shearwaters and petrels
Order: ProcellariiformesFamily: Procellariidae

The procellariids are the main group of medium-sized "true petrels", characterised by united nostrils with medium septum and a long outer functional primary.

Southern giant-petrel, Macronectes giganteus
Cape petrel, Daption capense
Great-winged petrel, Pterodroma macroptera (A)
Trindade petrel, Pterodroma arminjoniana
Herald petrel, Pterodroma heraldica
Soft-plumaged petrel, Pterodroma mollis (A)
Barau's petrel, Pterodroma baraui
Fairy prion, Pachyptila turtur (A)
Antarctic prion, Pachyptila desolata (A)
Slender-billed prion, Pachyptila belcheri (A)
Mascarene petrel, Pseudobulweria aterrima
Cory's shearwater, Ardenna diomedea (A)
Flesh-footed shearwater, Ardenna carneipes
Wedge-tailed shearwater, Ardenna pacificus
Short-tailed shearwater, Ardenna tenuirostris (A)
Tropical shearwater, Puffinus bailloni

Frigatebirds
Order: PelecaniformesFamily: Fregatidae

Frigatebirds are large seabirds usually found over tropical oceans. They are large, black-and-white or completely black, with long wings and deeply forked tails. The males have coloured inflatable throat pouches. They do not swim or walk and cannot take off from a flat surface. Having the largest wingspan-to-body-weight ratio of any bird, they are essentially aerial, able to stay aloft for more than a week.

Lesser frigatebird, Fregata ariel
Great frigatebird, Fregata minor (A)

Boobies and gannets
Order: PelecaniformesFamily: Sulidae

The sulids comprise the gannets and boobies. Both groups are medium to large coastal seabirds that plunge-dive for fish. 

Masked booby, Sula dactylatra
Brown booby, Sula leucogaster
Red-footed booby, Sula sula (A) (Ex)
Abbott's booby, Papasula abbotti (Ex)

Herons, egrets, and bitterns
Order: CiconiiformesFamily: Ardeidae

The family Ardeidae contains the bitterns, herons and egrets. Herons and egrets are medium to large wading birds with long necks and legs. Bitterns tend to be shorter necked and more wary. Members of Ardeidae fly with their necks retracted, unlike other long-necked birds such as storks, ibises and spoonbills.

Intermediate egret, Ardea intermedia (A)
Little egret, Egretta garzetta (A)
Cattle egret, Bubulcus ibis (A)
Squacco heron, Ardeola ralloides (A)
Striated heron, Butorides striata
Mauritius night-heron, Nycticorax mauritianus (X)
Rodrigues night-heron, Nycticorax megacephalus (X)
Black-crowned night-heron, Nycticorax nycticorax (A)

Hawks, eagles, and kites
Order: FalconiformesFamily: Accipitridae

Accipitridae is a family of birds of prey, which includes hawks, eagles, kites, harriers and Old World vultures. These birds have powerful hooked beaks for tearing flesh from their prey, strong legs, powerful talons and keen eyesight.

Eurasian marsh-harrier, Circus aeruginosus (A)
Madagascar fish-eagle, Haliaeetus vociferoides (A)

Owls
Order: StrigiformesFamily: Strigidae

The typical owls are small to large solitary nocturnal birds of prey. They have large forward-facing eyes and ears, a hawk-like beak and a conspicuous circle of feathers around each eye called a facial disk.

Rodrigues scops-owl, Otus murivorus (X)
Mauritius scops-owl, Otus sauzieri (X)

Rollers
Order: CoraciiformesFamily: Coraciidae

Rollers resemble crows in size and build, but are more closely related to the kingfishers and bee-eaters. They share the colourful appearance of those groups with blues and browns predominating. The two inner front toes are connected, but the outer toe is not. 

Broad-billed roller, Eurystomus glaucurus

Falcons and caracaras

Order: FalconiformesFamily: Falconidae

Falconidae is a family of diurnal birds of prey. They differ from hawks, eagles and kites in that they kill with their beaks instead of their talons.

Lesser kestrel, Falco naumanni (A)
Mauritius kestrel, Falco punctatus (E)
Eleonora's falcon, Falco eleonorae
Sooty falcon, Falco concolor (A)
Peregrine falcon, Falco peregrinus

Old World parrots

Order: PsittaciformesFamily: Psittaculidae

Characteristic features of parrots include a strong curved bill, an upright stance, strong legs, and clawed zygodactyl feet. Many parrots are vividly colored, and some are multi-colored. Old World parrots are found from Africa east across south and southeast Asia and Oceania to Australia and New Zealand.

Lesser vasa parrot, Coracopsis nigra (I)
Rose-ringed parakeet, Psittacula krameri (I)
Echo parakeet, Psittacula eques (E)
Newton's parakeet, Psittacula exsul (X)
Mauritius gray parrot, Lophopsittacus bensoni (X)
Broad-billed parrot, Lophopsittacus mauritianus (X)
Rodrigues parrot, Necropsittacus rodricanus (X)
Gray-headed lovebird, Agapornis canus (Ex)

Cuckooshrikes
Order: PasseriformesFamily: Campephagidae

The cuckooshrikes are small to medium-sized passerine birds. They are predominantly greyish with white and black, although some species are brightly coloured.

Mauritius cuckooshrike, Coracina typica (E)

Monarch flycatchers

Order: PasseriformesFamily: Monarchidae

The monarch flycatchers are small to medium-sized insectivorous passerines which hunt by flycatching. 

Mascarene paradise-flycatcher, Terpsiphone bourbonnensis

Crows, jays, and magpies
Order: PasseriformesFamily: Corvidae

The family Corvidae includes crows, ravens, jays, choughs, magpies, treepies, nutcrackers and ground jays. Corvids are above average in size among the Passeriformes, and some of the larger species show high levels of intelligence.

House crow, Corvus splendens (I)

Reed warblers and allies

Order: PasseriformesFamily: Acrocephalidae

The members of this family are usually rather large for "warblers". Most are rather plain olivaceous brown above with much yellow to beige below. They are usually found in open woodland, reedbeds, or tall grass. The family occurs mostly in southern to western Eurasia and surroundings, but it also ranges far into the Pacific, with some species in Africa.

Rodrigues warbler, Acrocephalus rodericanus (E)

Swallows
Order: PasseriformesFamily: Hirundinidae

The family Hirundinidae is adapted to aerial feeding. They have a slender streamlined body, long pointed wings and a short bill with a wide gape. The feet are adapted to perching rather than walking, and the front toes are partially joined at the base. 

Mascarene martin, Phedina borbonica (N)

Bulbuls
Order: PasseriformesFamily: Pycnonotidae

Bulbuls are medium-sized songbirds. Some are colourful with yellow, red or orange vents, cheeks, throats or supercilia, but most are drab, with uniform olive-brown to black plumage. Some species have distinct crests.

Red-whiskered bulbul, Pycnonotus jocosus (I)
Mauritius bulbul, Hypsipetes olivaceus (E)

White-eyes, yuhinas, and allies

Order: PasseriformesFamily: Zosteropidae

The white-eyes are small and mostly undistinguished, their plumage above being generally some dull colour like greenish-olive, but some species have a white or bright yellow throat, breast or lower parts, and several have buff flanks. As their name suggests, many species have a white ring around each eye. 

Mauritius white-eye, Zosterops chloronothos (E)
Mauritius gray white-eye, Zosterops mauritianus (E)

Starlings
Order: PasseriformesFamily: Sturnidae

Starlings are small to medium-sized passerine birds. Their flight is strong and direct and they are very gregarious. Their preferred habitat is fairly open country. They eat insects and fruit. Plumage is typically dark with a metallic sheen. 

Rodrigues starling, Necropsar rodericanus (X)
Common myna, Acridotheres tristis (I)

Weavers and allies

Order: PasseriformesFamily: Ploceidae

The weavers are small passerine birds related to the finches. They are seed-eating birds with rounded conical bills. The males of many species are brightly coloured, usually in red or yellow and black, some species show variation in colour only in the breeding season.

Village weaver, Ploceus cucullatus (I)
Red fody, Foudia madagascariensis (I)
Mauritius fody, Foudia rubra (E)
Rodrigues fody, Foudia flavicans (E)

Waxbills and allies
Order: PasseriformesFamily: Estrildidae

The estrildid finches are small passerine birds of the Old World tropics and Australasia. They are gregarious and often colonial seed eaters with short thick but pointed bills. They are all similar in structure and habits, but have wide variation in plumage colours and patterns. 

Scaly-breasted munia, Lonchura punctulata (I)
Common waxbill, Estrilda astrild (I)
Red avadavat, Amandava amandava (Ex)

Old World sparrows
Order: PasseriformesFamily: Passeridae

Old World sparrows are small passerine birds. In general, sparrows tend to be small, plump, brown or grey birds with short tails and short powerful beaks. Sparrows are seed eaters, but they also consume small insects. 

House sparrow, Passer domesticus (I)

Finches, euphonias, and allies
Order: PasseriformesFamily: Fringillidae

Finches are seed-eating passerine birds, that are small to moderately large and have a strong beak, usually conical and in some species very large. All have twelve tail feathers and nine primaries. These birds have a bouncing flight with alternating bouts of flapping and gliding on closed wings, and most sing well.

Yellow-fronted canary, Crithagra mozambica (I)

See also
List of birds
Lists of birds by region

References

External links
Birds of Mauritius

Mauritius
 
Birds
Mauritius